This is a list of notable Baltic Germans.

Art and literature

Architects
Alfred Aschenkampff (1858–1914), architect (Latvia)
Paul Max Bertschy (1840–1911), city architect of Liepāja (Latvia)
Bernhard Bielenstein (1877–1959), architect (Latvia)
Wilhelm Bockslaff (1858–1945), architect (Latvia)
Johann Felsko (1813–1902), architect (Latvia)
Karl Felsko, (1844–1918), architect (Latvia)
Christoph Haberland (1750–1803), architect (Latvia)
Otto Pius Hippius (1826–1883), architect (Estonia)
Erich Jacoby (1885–1941), architect (Estonia)
Paul Mandelstamm (1872–1941), architect (Latvia)
Robert Natus (1890–1950), architect (Estonia)
Robert Pflug (1832–1885), architect (Latvia)
August Reinberg (1860–1908), architect (Latvia)
Jacques Rosenbaum (1878–1944), architect (Estonia)
Alfred Rosenberg (1893–1946), politician, Nazi ideologist and architect (Germany)
Max Scherwinsky (1859–1909), architect and designer (Latvia)
Edmund von Trompowsky (1851–1919), architect (Latvia)

Artists
Christian Ackermann (died 1710), wood carver and sculptor (Estonia)
Johann Heinrich Baumann (1753–1832), painter (Latvia)
Karl Hans Bernewitz (1858–1934), sculptor (Latvia)
Gregor von Bochmann (1850–1930), painter (Estonia)
Bernhard Borchert (1863–1945), artist (Latvia)
Mikhail Clodt (1832–1902), painter (Russia)
Peter Clodt von Jürgensburg (1805–1867), sculptor (Russia)
Franz Burchard Dörbeck (1799–1835), graphic artist and caricaturist
Jacob Heinrich Elbfas (c. 1600–1664), painter (Sweden)
Eduard von Gebhardt (1838–1925), painter
Wilhelm August Golicke (1802–1848), painter
Eduard Hau (1807–1888), painter
Woldemar Hau (1816–1896), painter
August Matthias Hagen (1794–1878), painter
Julie Wilhelmine Hagen-Schwarz (1824–1902), painter, daughter of the above
Vasily Helmersen (1873–1893), artist and book illustrator
Carl von Hoffman (1889–1982), soldier, adventurer, author, and photographer (United States)
Franz Hoppenstätt (died 1657/1658), wood carver (Estonia)
George Hoyningen-Huene (1900–1968), fashion photographer
Alexander Julius Klünder, (1802–1875), portrait painter
Alexander Kotzebue (1815–1889), painter
Gerhard von Kügelgen (1772–1820), portrait and history painter
Karl von Kügelgen (1772–1832), landscape and history painter
Konstantin von Kügelgen (1810–1880), landscape painter
Otto Friedrich Theodor von Möller (1812–1874), painter
Carl Timoleon von Neff (1804–1877), painter (Estonia)
August Georg Wilhelm Pezold (1794–1859), painter and lithographer
Nikolaus Roerich (1874–1947), painter and philosopher (Russia)
Otto Magnus von Stackelberg (1786–1837), archaeologist, writer, art historian and painter
Egon von Vietinghoff (1903–1994), painter and philosopher (Germany, Switzerland)
Gottlieb Welté (1745/49–1792), etcher and landscape painter

Authors and writers
Friedrich Amelung (1842–1909), chess player, endgame composer, and journalist
Werner Bergengruen (1892–1964), novelist
Lovisa von Burghausen (1698–1733), slave and memoirist (Sweden)
Anton Delvig (1798–1831), poet and journalist (Russia)
Helene von Engelhardt (1850–1910)
Nikolai Erdman (1900–1970), poet and playwright (Soviet Union)
Julie Hausmann (1826–1901), poet
Hermann Hesse (1877–1962), poet, novelist, and painter (Germany)
Eduard von Keyserling (1855–1918), writer and playwright
August von Kotzebue (1761–1819), playwright (Germany)
Wilhelm Küchelbecker (1797–1846), poet and Decembrist (Russia)
Anatol Lieven (born 1960), author, journalist, and policy analyst (United Kingdom)
Garlieb Merkel (1769–1850), writer and public activist
Elisa von der Recke (1754–1833), writer and poet
Gleb Struve (1898–1985), poet and literary historian (United States)
Frank Thiess (1890–1977), writer (Germany)
Jakob von Uexkull (born 1944), writer and politician (Germany)
Peter Ernst Wilde (1732–1785), physician and journalist (Estonia)
Gero von Wilpert (1933–2009), writer and literary scientist

Entertainment

Actors and actresses
Heinz Erhardt (1909–1979), comedian, musician, entertainer, actor and poet
Irene von Meyendorff (1916–2001), film actress (Germany)
Marie Seebach (1830–1897), actress (Germany)

Musicians
John Christian Bechler (1784–1857), Moravian bishop and composer (United States, Russia)
Eduard Erdmann (1896–1958), pianist, composer, professor (Germany)
Heinz Erhardt (1909–1979), comedian, musician, entertainer, actor and poet
Eduard Mertke (1833–1895), composer and music teacher
Lena Meyer-Landrut (born 1991), singer (Germany)
Carl David Stegmann (1751–1826), tenor and composer
Raimund von zur-Mühlen (1854–1931), tenor and music educator

Entrepreneurs
James Martin Eder (1838–1921), pioneer of sugar industry in Colombia
Karl Otto Georg von Meck (1821–1876), businessman
Baron Nils Taube, (1928–2008), Britain's longest serving fund manager, colleague of George Soros and advisor to Lord Rothschild
Moritz Freiherr von Grotthuss (*1970), founder of Gestigon and Bareways

Explorers
Reinhold von Anrep-Elmpt (1834–1888), explorer
Karl Ernst von Baer (1792–1876), biologist, geologist, meteorologist, geographer, founder of embryology
Fabian Gottlieb von Bellingshausen (1778–1852), explorer (Russia)
Alexander von Bunge (1803–1890), botanist and expeditionist (Russia)
Karl von Ditmar (1822–1892), geologist and explorer (Russia)
Karl Eichwald (1795–1876), geologist and physician (Russia)
Johann Friedrich von Eschscholtz (1793–1831), biologist, physician and explorer (Russia)
Johann Anton Güldenstädt (1745–1781), naturalist and explorer
Ludwig von Hagemeister (1780–1833), seafarer and explorer (Russia)
Carl von Hoffman (1889–1982), soldier, adventurer, author, and photographer (United States)
Alexander von Kaulbars (1844–1925) military commander and explorer (Russia)
Otto von Kotzebue (1787–1846), explorer (Russia)
Adam Johann von Krusenstern (1770–1846), explorer (Russia)
Friedrich von Lütke (1797–1898), navigator and geographer (Russia)
Richard Maack (1825–1886), biologist, geographer and explorer (Russia)
Alexander von Middendorff (1815–1894), zoologist and explorer
Michael von Reinken (1801–1859), vice-admiral and hydrographer (Russia)
Otto Schmidt (1891–1956), mathematician, astronomer, geophysicist (Soviet Union)
Alexander von Schrenk (1816–1876), mineralogist, botanist and expeditionist (Russia)
Leopold von Schrenck (1826–1894), zoologist, geographer and ethnographer (Russia)
Georg August Schweinfurth (1836–1925), botanist and explorer
Eduard von Toll (1858–1902), geologist and explorer (Russia)
Ferdinand von Wrangel (1797–1870), explorer (Russia)

Military
Alexander of Courland (1658–1686), prince and military commander (Prussia)
Władysław Anders (1892–1970), military commander and politician (Poland)
Michael Andreas Barclay de Tolly (1761–1818), military commander (Russia)
Alexander von Benckendorff (1783–1844), military commander (Russia)
Konstantin von Benckendorff (1785–1828), military commander and diplomat (Russia)
Friedrich Wilhelm Rembert von Berg (1793–1874), military commander (Russia)
Karl Ludwig von Budberg (1775–1829), military commander (Russia)
Friedrich Wilhelm von Buxhoeveden (1750–1811), military commander (Russia)
Magnus Gustav von Essen (1759–1813), military commander (Russia)
Eduard von Totleben (1818–1884), engineer-general (Russia)
Nikolai von Essen (1860–1915), admiral (Russia)
Peter Kirillovich Essen (1772–1844), military commander (Russia)
Jürgen von Farensbach (1551–1602), military commander (Livonia)
William Fermor (1702–1771), military commander (Russia)
Wessel Freytag von Loringhoven (1899–1944), colonel and member of the Widerstand (Nazi Germany)
Adrian von Fölkersahm (1914–1945), military commander (Nazi Germany)
Dmitry Gustavovich von Fölkersahm (1846–1905), admiral (Russia)
Maksimas Katche (1879–1933), military commander (Russia, Lithuania)
Alexander von Kaulbars (1844–1925) military commander and explorer (Russia)
Paul Demetrius von Kotzebue (1801–1884), military officer (Russia)
Ernst Gideon von Laudon (1717–1790), military commander
Christoph von Lieven (1774–1839), military commander, politician and diplomat (Russia)
Eugen Ludwig Müller (1867–1939), military commander (Russia)
Burkhard Christoph von Münnich (1683–1767), military commander (Russia)
Fabian Gottlieb von der Osten-Sacken (1752–1837), field marshal (Russia)
Johann Patkul (1660–1707), politician and military commander (Sweden, Poland, Russia)
Wolter von Plettenberg (1450–1535), Master of Livonian Order
Paul von Rennenkampf (1854–1918), military commander (Russia)
Ernst von Stackelberg (1813–1870), diplomat and military figure
Georg von Stackelberg (1851–1913), cavalry general (Russia)
Roman von Ungern-Sternberg (1885–1921), military commander (Russia)
Viktor von Wahl (1840–1915), military commander and politician
Carl Gustaf Wrangel (1613–1676), military commander and statesman (Sweden)
Carl Henrik Wrangel (1681–1755), military commander (Sweden)
Herman Wrangel (1587–1643), military commander and statesman (Sweden)
Pyotr Nikolayevich von Wrangel (1878–1928), military commander (Russia)

Philosophers
Johann Eduard Erdmann (1805–1892), pastor, historian of philosophy (Latvia)
Nicolai Hartmann (1882–1950), philosopher (Germany)
Immanuel Kant (1724–1804), philosopher (Prussia)
Hermann Graf Keyserling (1880–1946), philosopher
Alfred Rosenberg (1893–1946), politician, Nazi ideologist and architect (Germany)
Egon von Vietinghoff (1903–1994), painter and philosopher (Germany, Switzerland)

Politicians and diplomats
Ernst Johann von Biron (1690–1772), Duke of Courland
Peter von Biron (1724–1800), Duke of Courland
Andreas von Budberg-Bönninghausen (1750–1812), diplomat and politician (Russia)
Andreas von Budberg-Bönninghausen (1817–1881), diplomat (Russia)
Sophie von Buxhoeveden (1883–1956), lady in waiting to Tsarina Alexandra of Russia
Balthasar von Campenhausen (1772–1823), politician (Russia)
Karl Robert von Nesselrode (1780–1862), diplomat (Russia)
Stanisław Ernest Denhoff (1673–1728), noble and statesman (Poland)
Kasper Doenhoff (1587–1645), courtier and diplomat (Poland)
Ernst Magnus Dönhoff (1581–1642), noble and diplomat
Princess Dorothea of Courland (1793–1862), noblewoman
Hans Reinhold von Fersen (1683–1786), military commander and politician (Sweden)
Reinhold Johan von Fersen (1646–1716), county governor (Sweden)
Ferdinand Kettler (1655–1737), Duke of Courland
Friedrich Kettler (1569–1642), Duke of Courland
Frederick William Kettler (1692–1711), Duke of Courland
Frederick Casimir Kettler (1650–1698), Duke of Courland
Gotthard Kettler (1517–1587), the last Master of the Livonian Order and the first Duke of Courland
Jacob Kettler (1610–1682), Duke of Courland
Wilhelm Kettler (1574–1640), Duke of Courland
Andreas Meyer-Landrut (born 1929), diplomat (Germany)
Christoph von Lieven (1774–1839), military commander, politician and diplomat (Russia)
Dorothea von Lieven (1785–1857), noblewoman and diplomat (Russia)
Christoph Johann von Medem (1763–1838), courtier (Russia)
Dorothea von Medem (1761–1821), last Duchess of Courland
Karl Robert von Nesselrode (1780–1862), diplomat (Russia)
 Peter Ludwig von der Pahlen, (1745–1826), military Governor of St. Petersburg from 1798 to 1801, played pivotal role in the assassination of Emperor Paul.
Johann Patkul (1660–1707), politician and military commander (Sweden, Poland, Russia)
Adolf Pilar von Pilchau (1851–1925), politician, regent of the United Baltic Duchy
Wolter von Plettenberg (1450–1535), Master of Livonian Order
Alfred Rosenberg (1893–1946), politician, Nazi ideologist and architect, and convicted war criminal (Germany)
Max Erwin von Scheubner-Richter (1884–1923), politician (Nazi Germany)
Jacob von Sievers (1731–1808), politician (Russia)
Ernest Stackelberg (1813–1870), diplomat and military figure
Gustav Ernst von Stackelberg (1766–1850), diplomat (Russia)
Otto Magnus von Stackelberg (1736–1800), diplomat (Russia)
Karl von Struve (1835–1907), politician and diplomat (Russia)
Jakob von Uexkull (born 1944), writer and politician (Germany)
Victor von Wahl (1840–1915), military commander and politician
Princess Wilhelmine (1781–1839), noble and the Duchess of Sagan
Sergei Witte (1849–1915), first Prime Minister of the Russian Empire (Russia)
Carl Gustaf Wrangel (1613–1676), military commander and statesman (Sweden)
Olaf von Wrangel (1928-2009), journalist and politician, member of Bundestag (Germany)
Herman Wrangel (1587–1643), military commander and statesman (Sweden)

Religion
Albert of Riga (Albert von Buxthoeven, 1165–1229), Bishop of Riga
Alexy II of Moscow (Alexey Mikhailovich Ridiger, 1929–2008), Patriarch of Moscow
John Christian Bechler (1784–1857), Moravian bishop and composer (United States, Russia)
Anna Hedvig Büll (1887–1981), Christian missionary
Reinhold von Buxhoeveden (died 1557), Bishop of Ösel-Wiek
Hermann of Dorpat (1163–1248), first Bishop of Dorpat
Oscar von Gebhardt (1844–1906), Lutheran theologian
Barbara von Krüdener (1764–1824), mystic
Hermann Wesel (died 1563), ecclesiastic and the last Bishop of Dorpat
Adolf von Harnack (1851–1930), Lutheran theologian and church historian (Germany)
Alexander Schmemann (1921–1983), Orthodox Christian priest, teacher, and writer

Scientists

Astronomers and cosmologists
Wilhelm Anderson (1880–1940), astrophysicist
Magnus Georg Paucker (1787–1855), astronomer and mathematician
Otto Schmidt (1891–1956), mathematician, astronomer, geophysicist (Soviet Union)
Friedrich Georg Wilhelm von Struve (1793–1864), astronomer (Russia)
Georg Hermann Struve (1886–1933), astronomer (Germany)
Hermann Struve (1854–1920), astronomer (Russia)
Ludwig Struve (1858–1920), astronomer (Russia)
Otto Struve (1897–1963), astronomer (Russia, United States)
Otto Wilhelm von Struve (1819–1905), astronomer (Russia)
Wilfried Struve (1914–1992), astronomer (Germany)
Gustav Andreas Tammann (1932–2019), astronomer (Germany, Switzerland)

Biologists and paleontologists
Hermann Martin Asmuss (1812–1859), paleozoologist (Estonia)
Karl Ernst von Baer (1792–1876), biologist, geologist, meteorologist, geographer, founder of embryology
Theodor Friedrich Julius Basiner (1816–1842), botanist
Friedrich Bidder (1810–1894), physiologist and anatomist (Russia)
Theophil Joachim Heinrich Bienert (1833–1873), botanist
Alexander von Bunge (1803–1890), botanist (Russia)
Karl Ernst Claus (1796–1864), chemist and naturalist
Johann Friedrich von Eschscholtz (1793–1831), biologist, physician and explorer (Russia)
Gustav Flor (1829–1883), zoologist
Peter von Glehn (1835–1876), botanist
Alexander von Keyserling (1815–1891), geologist and paleontologist
Karl Wilhelm von Kupffer (1829–1902), anatomist
Carl Friedrich von Ledebour (1785–1851), botanist (Russia)
Harald von Loudon (1876–1959), ornithologist
Johann Marcusen (1817–1894), ichthyologist
Friedrich Johann Graf von Medem (1912–1984), zoologist
Alexander von Middendorff (1815–1894), zoologist and explorer
Wilhelm Ostwald (1853–1932), chemist, winner of the Nobel prize in Chemistry
Wolfgang Ostwald (1883–1943), chemist and biologist (Germany)
Heinz Christian Pander (1794–1865), biologist, embryologist and paleontologist
Friedrich Parrot (1791–1841), biologist and medical scientist
Christian Nikolai Richard Pohle (1869–1926), botanist
Alexander von Schrenk (1816–1876), mineralogist, botanist and expeditionist (Russia)
Leopold von Schrenck (1826–1894), zoologist, geographer and ethnographer (Russia)
Jakob von Uexküll (1864–1944), biologist and semiotician (Germany)

Chemists and material scientists
Andreas von Antropoff (1878–1956), chemist, postulated neutronium 
Karl Ernst Claus (1796–1864), chemist and naturalist
Germain Henri Hess (1802–1850), chemist
Wilhelm Ostwald (1853–1932), chemist and Nobel laureate (Germany)
Wolfgang Ostwald (1883–1943), chemist and biologist (Germany)
Carl Schmidt (1822–1894), chemist (Russia)
Heinrich Wilhelm von Struve (1822–1908), chemist (Russia)
Gustav Tammann (1861–1938), chemist
Peter P. von Weymarn (1879–1935), chemist (Russia)
Margarete von Wrangell (1877–1932), agricultural chemist and the first female full professor at a German university

Earth scientists
Karl Ernst von Baer (1792–1876), biologist, geologist, meteorologist, geographer, founder of embryology
Karl von Ditmar (1822–1892), geologist and explorer (Russia)
Karl Eichwald (1795–1876), geologist and physician (Russia)
Gregor von Helmersen (1803–1885), geologist
Carl Hiekisch (1840–1901), geographer
Alexander Keyserling (1815–1891), geologist and paleontologist
Fyodor Litke (Friedrich Benjamin von Lütke, 1797–1898), navigator and geographer (Russia)
Otto Schmidt (1891–1956), mathematician, astronomer, geophysicist (Soviet Union)
Alexander von Schrenk (1816–1876), mineralogist, botanist and expeditionist (Russia)
Leopold von Schrenck (1826–1894), zoologist, geographer and ethnographer (Russia)
Georg August Schweinfurth (1836–1925), botanist and explorer
Eduard von Toll (1858–1902), geologist and explorer (Russia)

Economists and sociologists
August Johann Gottfried Bielenstein (1826–1907), linguist, folklorist, ethnographer and theologian
Dominic Lieven (born 1952), political scientist (London School of Economics, United Kingdom)
Paul von Lilienfeld (1829–1903), social scientist
Heinrich Freiherr von Stackelberg (1905–1946), economist (Germany)

Historians and archeologists
Georg Dehio (1850–1932), art historian
Paul Einhorn (died 1655), historian (Latvia)
Gustav von Ewers (1779–1830), legal historian and scholar (Russia)
Jean Baptiste Holzmayer (1839–1890), teacher, archeologist and folklorist (Estonia)
Otto Magnus von Stackelberg (1786–1937), archaeologist, writer, art historian and painter
Kurt Zoege von Manteuffel (1881–1941), art historian
Richard Otto Zöpffel (1843–1891), theologist and church historian

Linguists and ethnographers
Nikolai Anderson (1845–1905), philologist
Walter Anderson (1885–1962), folklorist
August Johann Gottfried Bielenstein (1826–1907), linguist, folklorist, ethnographer and theologian
Peter A. Boodberg (1903–1972), sinologist (United States)
Emil Bretschneider (1833–1901), sinologist
Johann Christoph Brotze (1742–1823), pedagogue and ethnographer
Elena Lieven (b. 1947), psycholinguist and cognitive scientist (United Kingdom)
Leopold von Schrenck (1826–1894), zoologist, geographer and ethnographer (Russia)
Alexander von Staël-Holstein (1877–1937), orientalist, sinologist, sanskritologist (Estonia)
Vasily Vasilievich Struve (1889–1965), orientalist (Soviet Union)
Jakob von Uexküll (1864–1944), biologist and semiotician (Germany)
Thure von Uexküll (1908–2004), semiotician (Germany)
Alexander Vostokov (1781–1864), philologist (Russia)
Edgar de Wahl (1867–1948), linguist (Estonia)
Ferdinand Johann Wiedemann (1805–1887), linguist (Estonia)
Gero von Wilpert (1933–2009), writer and literary scientist

Mathematicians
Oskar Anderson (1887–1960), mathematician and statistician
Georg Cantor (1845–1918), mathematician (Germany)
Edgar Krahn (1894–1961), mathematician
Theodor Molien (1861–1941), mathematician
Magnus Georg Paucker (1787–1855), astronomer and mathematician
Erhard Schmidt (1876–1959), mathematician
Otto Schmidt (1891–1956), mathematician, astronomer, geophysicist (Soviet Union)

Physicians and psychologists
Ernst von Bergmann (1836–1907), surgeon (Germany)
Eugen Bostroem (1850–1928), pathologist
Arthur Böttcher (1831–1889), pathologist and anatomist
Isidorus Brennsohn (1854–1928), doctor of medicine and biographer
Karl Gottfried Konstantin Dehio (1851–1927), internist and pathologist
Karl Eichwald (1795–1876), geologist and physician (Russia)
Johann Friedrich von Eschscholtz (1793–1831), biologist, physician and explorer (Russia)
Woldemar Kernig (1840–1917), physician
Karl Wilhelm von Kupffer (1829–1902), anatomist
Elena Lieven, psycholinguist and cognitive scientist (United Kingdom)
Werner Zoege von Manteuffel (1857–1926), medical surgeon
Georg von Oettingen (1824–1916), ophthalmologist
Friedrich Parrot (1791–1841), biologist and medical scientist
Zacharias Stopius ( 1535 – end of the 16th or early 17th century), doctor and astronomer
Thure von Uexküll (1908–2004), semiotician (Germany)
Eduard Georg von Wahl (1833–1890), surgeon
Justus Heinrich Wigand (1769–1817), obstetrician
Peter Ernst Wilde (1732–1785), physician and journalist

Physicists
Heinrich Lenz (1804–1865), physicist
Arthur von Oettingen (1836–1920), physicist, meteorologist and music theorist
Georg Wilhelm Richmann (1711–1753), physicist
Thomas Johann Seebeck (1770–1831), physicist

Theologians
August Johann Gottfried Bielenstein (1826–1907), linguist, folklorist, ethnographer and theologian
Georg Caspari (1683–1743), theologian
Alexander von Oettingen (1827–1905), theologian
Richard Otto Zöpffel (1843–1891), theologist and historian

Other scientists and engineers
Jean Alexander Heinrich Clapier de Colongue (1838–1901), marine engineer and naval architect (Russia)
Bernhard Schmidt (1879–1935), optician, inventor (Estonia)
Amand Struve (1835–1898), military engineer and bridge specialist (Russia)
Friedrich Zander (1887–1933), rocket scientist (Russia, Soviet Union)
Walter Zapp (1905–2003), inventor (Latvia, Estonia)

Sports
Ursula Donath (born 1931), runner (East Germany)

Chess players
Friedrich Amelung (1842–1909), cultural historian, businessman and endgame composer
Andreas Ascharin (1843–1896), chess master
Bernhard Gregory (1879–1939), chess master
Lionel Kieseritzky (1806–1853), chess master
R.K. Kieseritzky (1870–?), chess master
Theodor Molien (1861–1941), mathematician and chess problemist
Paul Felix Schmidt (1916–1984), chess master
Wilhelm von Stamm (?–1905), chess master (Latvia)

Other
Johann Burchart (1546–1616), pharmacist
Gustav Fabergé (1814–1893), jeweller
Nikolai von Glehn (1841–1923), landowner and public figure, founder of Nõmme
Vasiliy Ulrikh (1889–1951), judge, Great Purge perpetrator (Soviet Union)

Baltic Germans
 List of Baltic Germans
German

References